Hayrettin Erkmen (19 April 1915 – 18 May 1999) was the minister of foreign affairs of the Republic of Turkey. He was in office from 12 November 1979 to 5 September 1980.

References

Ministers of Foreign Affairs of Turkey
Members of the 43rd government of Turkey
Members of the 20th government of Turkey
Members of the 21st government of Turkey
Burials at Aşiyan Asri Cemetery
1915 births
1999 deaths